Jerold Wells (8 August 1908 – 19 July 1999) was an English actor. He was born in Wallington, Hampshire, and died in Bath, Somerset.

He appeared primarily in British comedies. Films included Adventures of a Plumber's Mate and the TV-made 'Carry On Kitchener'. Two of his best-known roles were in Time Bandits, where he played Benson, a mentally disturbed follower of Evil, and in Jabberwocky, in which he played a footless man known as "Wat Dabney". He also appeared on television, in The Two Ronnies, Coronation Street, The Old Curiosity Shop, Catweazle and The Benny Hill Show.

Partial filmography
 Three in One (1957) - Wally (segment "Joe Wilson's Mates")
 The Naked Truth (1957) - 1st Irishman (uncredited)
 High Hell (1958) - Charlie Spence
 Law and Disorder (1958) - Cell Warder (uncredited)
 Passport to Shame (1958) - Taxi Driver in Office (uncredited)
 The Criminal (1960) - Warder Brown
 Dangerous Afternoon (1961) - George 'Butch' Birling
 Playback (1962) - Insp. Parkes
 Crooks Anonymous (1962) - Sydney - Large Nightwatchman
 Edgar Wallace Mysteries - 'Candidate for Murder', episode - (1962) - Police Inspector
 The Pirates of Blood River (1962) - Penal Colony Master
 Maniac (1963) - Giles
 The Cracksman (1963) - Chief Prison Officer
 Masquerade (1965) - Brindle (uncredited)
 Smashing Time (1967) - Man in Cafe No. 6
 The Ghost of Monk's Island (1967) - Convict
 A Ghost of a Chance (1968)
 Journey into Darkness (1968) - Mayhew (episode 'Paper Dolls')
 Anne of the Thousand Days (1969) - Boleyn Axeman (uncredited)
 Burke & Hare (1971) - Landlord
 Never Mind the Quality, Feel the Width (1973) - Tramp
 The Vault of Horror (1973) - Waiter (segment 1 "Midnight Mess")
 Gawain and the Green Knight (1973) - Sergeant
 Frankenstein and the Monster from Hell (1974) - Landlord
 Barry McKenzie Holds His Own (1974) - Quiz Panel Judge (uncredited)
 Jabberwocky (1977) - Wat Dabney
 Adventures of a Plumber's Mate (1978) - Stropper
 A Hitch in Time (1978) - The King (uncredited)
 Time Bandits (1981) - Benson
 The Element of Crime (1984) - Kramer
 Sword of the Valiant'' (1984) - 1st Torturer

External links

1908 births
1999 deaths
People from Fareham
English male film actors
English male television actors
20th-century English male actors